{{safesubst:#invoke:RfD||2=Inerrancy and Infallibility of the Bible|month = March
|day =  6
|year = 2023
|time = 11:21
|timestamp = 20230306112153

|content=
redirect Biblical inspiration

}}